The Municipality of Videm is a municipality in Slovenia. It includes part of the flatlands south of Ptuj and extends beyond the Dravinja River into the Haloze Hills to the south. The area belongs to the traditional region of Styria. It is now included in the Drava Statistical Region. The administrative centre of the municipality is the settlement of Videm pri Ptuju.

Settlements
In addition to the town of Videm pri Ptuju, the municipality also includes the following settlements:

 Barislovci
 Belavšek
 Berinjak
 Dolena
 Dravci
 Dravinjski Vrh
 Gradišče
 Jurovci
 Lancova Vas
 Ljubstava
 Majski Vrh
 Mala Varnica
 Pobrežje
 Popovci
 Repišče
 Sela
 Skorišnjak
 Soviče
 Spodnji Leskovec
 Strmec pri Leskovcu
 Šturmovci
 Trdobojci
 Trnovec
 Tržec
 Vareja
 Velika Varnica
 Veliki Okič
 Zgornja Pristava
 Zgornji Leskovec

References

External links
 
 Videm municipal site
 the Municipality of Videm on Geopedia

Populated places in the Municipality of Videm
Videm